This article documents notable spaceflight events during the year 2019.

Overview

Lunar exploration 

The Chinese probe Chang'e 4 made humanity's first soft landing on the far side of the Moon on 3 January and released its Yutu 2 rover to explore the lunar surface on the far side for the first time in human history.  
Israel's SpaceIL, one of the participants in the expired Google Lunar X Prize, launched the first private mission to the Moon in February. The Beresheet lander from SpaceIL made the landing attempt in April, but crashed onto the Moon. India launched the delayed Chandrayaan-2 lunar orbiter/lander/rover in July; the orbiter reached lunar orbit in September, but the Vikram lander crashed onto the lunar surface.

Exploration of the Solar System 

The probe New Horizons encountered the Kuiper belt object 486958 Arrokoth on 1 January. This is the farthest object from the Sun ever to have a close encounter with a spacecraft. The Japanese asteroid exploration mission Hayabusa2 made a second touchdown with 162173 Ryugu to collect samples, and departed for Earth on 12 November. NASA declared the Mars rover Opportunity's mission over on 13 February. The InSight lander observed the first recorded Marsquake in April.

Human spaceflight 
The first Commercial Crew Development test missions flew this year, aiming to restore United States human spaceflight capability following Space Shuttle retirement in 2011. In an uncrewed test flight, SpaceX SpaceX Dragon 2 successfully flew on a Falcon 9 to the International Space Station on 3 March 2019; the crewed mission was delayed when the recovered capsule exploded during testing on 20 April. Boeing's CST-100 Starliner launched a similar uncrewed test flight on an Atlas V on 20 December, but an anomaly during launch meant that it could not reach the ISS and had to land only 2 days later.

Rocket innovation 

At the beginning of the year, around 100 small satellite launchers were in active use, in development, or were recently cancelled or stalled. Three Chinese manufacturers launched their first orbital rocket in 2019: The maiden flight of OS-M1 in March failed to reach orbit, the maiden flights of Hyperbola-1 in July and of Jielong 1 in August were successful. The PSLV-DL and PSLV-QL variants of the Indian PSLV first flew in January and April respectively.

SpaceX began testing of the SpaceX Starship in 2019, with an uncrewed prototype "Starhopper" flying 150m in the air in a suborbital test flight on 27 August. The heavy-lift Long March 5 made its return to flight in December, more than two years after the July 2017 launch failure that grounded the vehicle and forced an engine redesign.

The "single stick" Delta IV was retired in August, and the analog-controlled Soyuz-FG was retired in September. Due to Ukraine banning control system exports to Russia, Rokot was retired after a final flight in December.

Orbital launches 

|colspan=8 style="background:white;"|

January 
|-

|colspan=8 style="background:white;"|

February 
|-

|colspan=8 style="background:white;"|

March 
|-

|colspan=8 style="background:white;"|

April 
|-

|colspan=8 style="background:white;"|

May 
|-

|colspan=8 style="background:white;"|

June 
|-

|colspan=8 style="background:white;"|

July 
|-

|colspan=8 style="background:white;"|

August 
|-

|colspan=8 style="background:white;"|

September 
|-

|colspan=8 style="background:white;"|

October 
|-

|colspan=8 style="background:white;"|

November 
|-

|colspan=8 style="background:white;"|

December 
|-

|}

Suborbital flights 

|}

Deep-space rendezvous

Extravehicular activities (EVAs)

Space debris events

Orbital launch statistics

By country 
For the purposes of this section, the yearly tally of orbital launches by country assigns each flight to the country of origin of the rocket, not to the launch services provider or the spaceport. For example, Soyuz launches by Arianespace in Kourou are counted under Russia because Soyuz-2 is a Russian rocket.

By rocket

By family

By type

By configuration

By spaceport

By orbit

Notes

References

External links

 
Spaceflight by year
2019-related lists
Spaceflight
Transport timelines by year
Science timelines by year